Francis Robicsek (July 4, 1925 – April 3, 2020) was an American cardio-thoracic surgeon in Charlotte, North Carolina. Before moving to America, he was one of the surgeons to perform Hungary’s first heart valve replacement surgeries in 1954. He was the first surgeon to perform heart bypass surgeries in the state in 1956 and the first heart transplant in 1986. He was the founder of the Sanger Clinic and the developer of the Robicsek sternal weave technique.

Childhood and education 
Robicsek was born in Hungary as Ferenc Robicsek. He worked as a medical practitioner from 1945 to 1950 while earning his medical license from Péter Pázmány University. He was among the team of surgeons to perform the first heart valve replacement surgery in Hungary in 1954.

Career 
Robicsek was the chief of Cardiac Surgery at the University of Budapest when he was 28 years old. He immigrated to America in 1956 joined Paul W. Sanger and began working at Charlotte Memorial Hospital (a.k.a. Carolinas Medical Center) now Atrium Health. He pioneered cardio-vascular procedures in North Carolina and performed the first heart transplant in that state in 1986. 

In 1965, Robicsek developed the Robicsek technique which customizes a single surgical intervention for people suffering from an unstable sternum.

Throughout his surgical career, he served as the Chairman of the Thoracic and Cardiovascular Surgery Department at Carolinas Medical Center in Charlotte, North Carolina, the Medical Director of the Carolinas Heart Institute, and President and Founder of the Sanger Clinic. He also maintained teaching positions as the Clinical Professor of Surgery at the University of North Carolina in Chapel Hill, and as an Adjunct Professor in Biomedical Engineering and Anthropology at the University of North Carolina at Charlotte. 

In 1998, he retired from surgery, after operating on more than 50,000 patients. He continued his medical work through humanitarian medical outreach through Heineman Medical Outreach, Inc. and Atrium Health.

In adherence to his wishes, which he articulated before his April 2020 death, he was buried in his surgical scrubs.

Philanthropy and humanitarian work 
In 1959, he became President of Heineman Research, Inc. (a.k.a. Heineman Medical Outreach Inc.) now Heineman-Robicsek Foundation, Inc., a research and humanitarian medical outreach organization in Charlotte.

Robicsek traveled to Central and South America to offer medical services. In 1976, he was part of a medical team that worked following an earthquake in Honduras. He eventually established cardiac surgery in Guatemala and supported numerous hospitals and clinics in Central American and Caribbean countries. He wrote four books about Mayan culture and archeology.

He was an ancient art collector. He donated a significant collection to the Mint Museum.

Awards and recognition 
1997: The Order of Quetzal (Orden del Quetzal), Commander.
2007: The World Affairs Council of Charlotte, World Citizen Award.
2013: Leadership Charlotte, Lifetime Achievement Award.
2017: American College of Surgeons, Humanitarian Award.
2018: the Sanger Heart and Vascular Institute endowed a $3.5 million chair in Robicsek’s name.
2019: Southern Thoracic Surgical Association Inspiration Award.

Personal life 
He married Lilly in 1953. They fled from Soviet-controlled Hungary together via East Berlin; they spent some time in an Austrian refugee camp before arriving in America. The couple had four children.

References 

1925 births
2020 deaths
American surgeons
Hungarian emigrants to the United States
Physicians from North Carolina
History of heart surgery